Lac-Masketsi is an unorganized territory in the Mauricie region of province of Quebec, Canada, part of the Mékinac Regional County Municipality. Most of its area is part of the Zec Tawachiche. The discharge of Masketsi Lake at the south-east flows in the Little Lake Masketsi, which empties into the Tawachiche West River.

Toponymy 

It is named after Masketsi Lake that is located within its boundaries. This name first appeared on a map from 1870 by Eugène-Étienne Taché and is of Amerindian origin meaning "moccasin".

Geography 

The Canadian National Railway to Abitibi runs from 1909, linking Hervey-Jonction to La Tuque. The railway was built along the eastern shore of this lake, and was servicing the hamlets of Gouin and Lac-Masketsi. Each hamlet had a railway station that has long served the lumber camps, resorts and tourist activities.

In 2004, Lac-Masketsi was reduced in size by some  when portions were annexed by mostly Trois-Rives (70 km²) as well as Lac-aux-Sables (20 km²).

Economy 

The economy of this unorganized territory is mainly focused on forestry, resorts and tourist activities. This area is mostly forest and has many mountainous areas.

Demographics
Population trend:
 Population in 2011: 0 (2006 to 2011 population change: -100.0%)
 Population in 2006: 5
 Population in 2001: 10
 Population in 1996: 4
 Population in 1991: 0

Private dwellings occupied by usual residents: 0 (total dwellings: 0)

See also 

 Lake Masketsi (Mékinac)
 Batiscanie, Quebec,
 Tawachiche River,
 Tawachiche West River,
 Zec Tawachiche,
 Lac-aux-Sables,
 Trois-Rives.
 Mékinac Regional County Municipality.

References

Unorganized territories in Mauricie
Mékinac Regional County Municipality